National Route 185 is a national highway of Japan connecting Kure, Hiroshima and Mihara, Hiroshima in Japan, with a total length of 68.4 km (42.5 mi).

References

National highways in Japan
Roads in Hiroshima Prefecture